J. J. Smith may refer to:

 J. J. Smith (Gaelic footballer), Carlow Gaelic footballer
 J. J. Smith (author) (born 1970), American author, nutritionist and weight management expert
 J. J. Smith or J. J. Sm., Johannes Jacobus Smith (1867–1947), Dutch botanist
 James J. Smith, FBI Supervisory Special agent
 James John Smith (electrical engineer), American applied mathematician
 J. J. Smith (linguist) (1883–1949), South African linguistics

See also
 J. Smith (disambiguation)
 JJ (disambiguation)
 List of people with surname Smith